"" is the 7th single by Zard and released 21 April 1993 under B-Gram Records label. The single debuted at #2 rank first week. It charted for 15 weeks and sold over 802,000 copies.

Track list
All songs are written by Izumi Sakai, composed by Seiichiro Kuribayashi and arranged by Masao Akashi

single and album version (named as B-version) have different arrangements
the song was used in Nippon TV drama Kanojo no kiraina Kanojo as theme song

Daria Kawashima and Maki Ohguro are participating in chorus
 (original karaoke)
(original karaoke)

References

1993 singles
Zard songs
1993 songs
Songs written by Izumi Sakai
Songs written by Seiichiro Kuribayashi
Song recordings produced by Daiko Nagato